Chakra (officially Chakra GNU/Linux) was a Linux distribution originally based on Arch Linux and focused on KDE software, intending to provide a KDE/Qt minimizing use of other widget toolkits where possible. It was well received by critics during its existence.

History 
In June 2006 a group of Arch Linux users initiated the KDEmod packaging project to improve and simplify a standard KDE installation with Arch Linux. In December 2008 the group released their first custom made ISO with a preconfigured Arch + KDEmod + Tribe. After several releases lead developer Jan Mette suggested to split from Arch to allow for a much closer integration with KDE software.

On August 30, 2010, the first independent version, called Chakra 0.2, was released. This ended the development on KDEmod and the project was renamed to "The Chakra Project".

On December 27, 2021, the lead developer of Chakra announced the discontinuation of the project including accounts and services, citing a lack of project activity since November 2019.

On 11 April 2022, the board of Software in the Public Interest, Inc. (SPI), who owned the trademark of Chakra, voted unanimously on the removal of Chakra as an associated project of the SPI, based on the request from Chakra.

Features 
Chakra included both free and proprietary software, though the latter had the ability to be disabled during installation. It was only available for the x86_64 architecture, with support for i686 having been dropped in August 2012. It is based on KDE Software Compilation.

Chakra did not schedule releases for specific dates but used a "Half-Rolling release" system. This meant that the core packages of Chakra (graphics, audio, etc.) were frozen and only updated to fix security vulnerabilities. The aforementioned packages were updated after the latest versions were thoroughly tested before being moved to the stable repositories (about every six months). This allowed Chakra to ensure stability for the rest of the software included. Other applications such as web browsers, office suites, etc. were updated following the rolling release model and were generally available immediately after their release.

Installation 
The Chakra website supplied ISO images that could be run from CD, DVD or USB. Two ISO image versions were provided; a full edition providing more applications, and a minimal edition providing less applications. The graphical Chakra installation program was called "Calamares".

Package management

Repositories 
The following repositories were known to exist during Chakra's existence: 
 core, which contains all the packages needed to set up a base system.
 desktop, which contains KDE Software Compilation packages and Chakra tools.
 gtk, which contains various well-known GTK applications.
 lib32, a centralized repository for x86_64 users to more readily support 32-bit applications in a 64-bit environment.

A testing repository also existed that contained versions of packages that were deemed not stable, but ready for testing by users.

There were also unstable repositories that included applications still considered to be unstable. These repositories also included packages built directly from the upstream source code, and were not ready for the testing or stable repositories. There were two repositories that fulfilled this, the repositories being:

 unstable, which contains development versions of general packages.
 kde-unstable, which contains development versions of KDE Software Compilation packages.

Chakra Community Repository (CCR) 
In addition to the official repositories, users could install packages from the Chakra Community Repository (CCR). Like the Arch User Repository (AUR) which inspired it, the CCR provides user-made PKGINFOs and PKGBUILD scripts for software which is not included in the official repositories. CCR packages simplify building from source by explicitly listing and checking for dependencies and configuring the install to match the Chakra architecture. The CCR helper programs can further streamline the downloading and building process.

A CCR package with many votes and which conforms to the Chakra software policy may be transferred to the official repositories.

Reception 
Jesse Smith reviewed Chakra GNU/Linux 0.3.1 for DistroWatch Weekly:

LinuxBSDos.com wrote a review about Chakra Linux in 2011. It stated:

Dedoimedo reviewed Chakra 2011.09. Dedoimedo wrote:

LWN.net wrote a post on Chakra Linux. Said post stated:

Everyday Linux User reviewed Chakra 2015.11. Said review included the following statement:

References

External links 
 
 
 

Arch-based Linux distributions
KDE
Operating system distributions bootable from read-only media
Pacman-based Linux distributions
X86-64 Linux distributions
Linux distributions
Rolling Release Linux distributions
Discontinued Linux distributions